Dinonemertes is a genus of ribbon worms within the family Dinonemertidae.

Species 

 Dinonemertes alberti 
 Dinonemertes arctica 
 Dinonemertes grimaldii 
 Dinonemertes investigatoris 
 Dinonemertes mollis 
 Dinonemertes shinkaii

References 

Nemertea genera
Polystilifera